Culver Community High School is a four-year comprehensive public high school in Culver, Indiana. It is fully accredited by the Indiana Department of Education and the North Central Association Commission on Accreditation and School Improvement. The high school is part of the Culver Community Schools Corporation, along with one middle school and one elementary school.

About
Culver Community is a school corporation in Indiana that serves students from four townships in four different counties; Aubbeenaubbee Township in Fulton County, North Bend Township in Starke County, Tippecanoe Township in Pulaski County and Union Township in Marshall County. The building was opened in 1968, when these four townships consolidated into the current system.

Culver Community High School offers a full academic program, along with a vocational program. C.C.H.S. also offers extra-curricular activities, including eighteen clubs and twenty-one teams in ten sports.

In addition to a principal an assistant principal and an athletic director, the staff includes one counselor, two technology personnel, and twenty-four teachers. Another twenty-two people make up their office staff, instructional assistants, cooks, and custodians.

The school's mission is "to provide students with opportunities to acquire academic knowledge, technical skills, universal awareness, and emotional growth in a safe and nurturing environment."

See also
 List of high schools in Indiana

References

External links
 Official Website

Public high schools in Indiana
Educational institutions established in 1968
Schools in Marshall County, Indiana
1968 establishments in Indiana